Austria competed at the 2014 European Athletics Championships in Zürich, Switzerland, between 12 and 17 August 2014. A delegation of thirteen athletes were sent to represent the country.

References

Nations at the 2014 European Athletics Championships
2014
European Athletics Championships